Spy Hunter is a vehicular combat racing game developed by TT Fusion, published by Warner Bros. Interactive Entertainment, and released for the PlayStation Vita and Nintendo 3DS. The game was the second reboot of the Spy Hunter series, following the first reboot of the franchise in 2001.

Reception

The game received "mixed" reviews on both platforms according to the review aggregation website Metacritic. In Japan, Famitsu gave it a score of all four sevens for a total of 28 out of 40.

References

External links
 

2012 video games
Nintendo 3DS games
PlayStation Vita games
Spy Hunter
Video games developed in the United Kingdom
Warner Bros. video games
Multiplayer and single-player video games
Video game reboots

it:Spy Hunter